Marek Mirosław Plura (18 July 1970 – 21 January 2023) was a Polish politician, social activist, and psychotherapist. He was a two-time member of the Polish Parliament and served as Member of the European Parliament (MEP) from 2014 until 2019.

In 2019, Plura was the recipient of the Employment, Social Affairs and Regions Award at The Parliament Magazine's annual MEP Awards.

References 

1970 births
2023 deaths
People from Racibórz
Civic Platform MEPs
Polish disability rights activists
MEPs for Poland 2014–2019
Members of the Polish Sejm 2007–2011
Members of the Polish Sejm 2011–2015
Members of the Senate of Poland 2019–2023
University of Silesia in Katowice alumni
People with spinal muscular atrophy
Politicians with disabilities